Dolly Parton's America is a 2019 podcast hosted by Jad Abumrad and reported and produced by Shima Oliaee at WNYC Studios. It is a nine-part non-fiction series based on Dolly Parton's career and enduring legacy. The series begins with how Abumrad learned that his father, Naji Abumrad, a doctor, had befriended Parton after she survived a minor traffic accident. Abumrad sought out an introduction to Parton in an effort to understand how she remains one of the most popular and well respected musicians in America. Each episode covers a different aspect of Parton's career, from her early life, to her unique approach to politics, her most famous songs and creation of the Dollywood theme park. The name of the podcast was based on a history class at the University of Tennessee - Knoxville also titled Dolly Parton’s America taught by Dr. Lynn Sacco.

Reception 
Dolly Parton's America received largely positive responses from most mainstream media, including NPR, The Guardian, Vulture and others. The New York Times called it "a genial, compulsively listenable crash course in Parton's lasting appeal." The podcast won a Peabody Award in the Podcast/Radio category.

Episodes

See also 
 Music podcast

References

External links 
 

Dolly Parton
Audio podcasts
2019 podcast debuts
Music podcasts
2019 podcast endings
Documentary podcasts